Linda Amyot (born June 28, 1958) is a Canadian writer living in the Lanaudière region of Quebec.

Biography 
She was born in Joliette and earned a master's degree in literary studies at the Université du Québec à Montréal. During the 1980s and 1990s, Amyot published short stories in various Quebec literary magazines such as XYZ, Mœbius, Contre Ciel and Arcade. She works as an editor and as a writer of television documentaries and of audiovisual presentations for businesses. She also contributes to the literary magazine Nuit blanche. She helped create the À voix haute organization, which presents live performances by professional comedians of complete works or excerpts of works by Quebec authors. In 2011, she received the Prix à la création artistique awarded by the Conseil des arts et des lettres du Québec.

Selected works 
 Ha Long, novel (2004), finalist for the Prix Anne-Hébert and for the 
 La fille d'en face (2010), won the TD Canadian Children's Literature Award and the Prix Jeunesse des libraires du Québec

References

External links 
 

1958 births
Living people
Governor General's Award-winning children's writers
Canadian novelists in French
Writers from Montreal
Canadian women novelists
Canadian women children's writers
21st-century Canadian novelists
Université du Québec à Montréal alumni
21st-century Canadian women writers
Canadian children's writers in French